The 1945 Moscow Victory Parade also known as the Parade of Victors was a victory parade held by the Soviet Armed Forces (with the Color Guard Company representing the First Polish Army) after the defeat of Nazi Germany. This, the longest and largest military parade ever held on Red Square in the Soviet capital Moscow, involved 40,000 Red Army soldiers and 1,850 military vehicles and other military hardware. The parade lasted just over two hours on a rainy June 24, 1945, over a month after May 9, the day of Germany's surrender to Soviet commanders.

Stalin's order for the observance of the parade
The parade itself was ordered by Joseph Stalin on June 22, 1945, by virtue of Order 370 of the Office of the Supreme Commander in Chief, Armed Forces of the USSR.
This order is as follows: 

This was preceded by another letter by General of the Army Aleksei Antonov, Chief of the General Staff of the Soviet Armed Forces to all the participant fronts in attendance on the 24th of the previous month which is as follows:

Parade training
Intensive preparations for the parade took place in late May and early June in Moscow. The preliminary rehearsal of the Victory Parade took place at the Central Airfield, and the general rehearsal on Red Square on June 22.

Marshals Georgy Zhukov, who had formally accepted the German surrender to the Soviet Union, and Konstantin Rokossovsky, rode through the parade ground on white and black stallions, respectively. The fact is commemorated by the equestrian statue of Zhukov in front of the State Historical Museum, on Manege Square. Zhukov's stallion was called Кумир ("Idol") while Rokossovsky's was called Столб ("Pole"). The General Secretary of the Communist Party of the Soviet Union, Joseph Stalin, stood atop Lenin's Mausoleum and watched the parade alongside other dignitaries present.

According to certain editions of Zhukov's memoirs, Stalin had intended to ride through the parade himself, but he fell from the horse during the rehearsal and had to yield the honor to Zhukov, who used to be a cavalry officer. However, this story is disputed by former Soviet spy Viktor Suvorov. He claims that the story was inserted into Zhukov's memoirs as a counterargument to his theory, (although it apparently was in circulation earlier) that Stalin didn't lead the parade because he considered the war's results not worthy of the effort invested. Suvorov notes several inconsistencies in the story, along with numerous evidence that Zhukov was intended all along for the role of leading the parade; for example, the memoirs of Sergei Shtemenko, the man responsible at the time for the preparation of the parade, state that the roles were decided from the start, and Igor Bobylev (who took part in the preparations) claims that the story never happened and that Stalin never visited the Manege at that time. Another planned part of the parade was the march of the Victory Banner, which was delivered to Moscow from Berlin on June 20 and was supposed to begin the procession of troops. Despite this, the weak drill training of Mikhail Yegorov, Meliton Kantaria and Stepan Neustroev forced Marshal Zhukov to not go ahead with this portion of the parade.

The parade

Displays of the Red Army vehicles were some of the focal points of the ceremony. It was one of the few times in which Cossacks took part in a victory parade, with personnel from the 4th Guards Cossacks Cavalry Corps taking part in the procession of troops as part of the 2nd Ukrainian Front's combined regiment. One of the most famous moments at the end of the troops parade took place when soldiers from the Separate Operational Purpose Division of the NKVD carried the German standards and threw them down next to the mausoleum. One of the standards that was tossed down belonged to the LSSAH, Hitler's personal bodyguard. 

The next day, a reception was held in the Grand Kremlin Palace in honor of the participants in the Victory Parade. Due to the bad weather that day the flypast segment and the planned civil parade were cancelled; if the weather had improved, the flypast would have been led by Chief Marshals of Aviation Alexander Novikov and Alexander Golovanov.  Nonetheless, this historic two-hour parade remains the longest and largest military parade in Red Square's history, and involved 40,000 soldiers and 1,850 military vehicles and other military hardware.

Band and music
The procession had musical accompaniment that was provided by the massed bands of the Moscow Garrison, led by Major General Semyon Tchernetsky, Senior Director of Music. The combined band consisted of 38 military bands coming from Moscow military schools, as well as military units of the Red Army and the NKVD. The combined band numbered 1,220 musicians under the direction of 50 bandmasters. In total,the  parade saw the participation of 1,313 musicians, the youngest of whom was 13 years old.

The parade repertoire was finalized for approval on 5 June 1945. The final list included 36 tracks, including the Soviet anthem, fanfares and slow marches. Twenty works that were performed at the parade were written by Tchernetsky himself. The inspection part of the parade commenced with Tchernetsky's Jubilee Slow March "25 Years of the Red Army" and ended with the performance of Slavsya. The first song after the conclusion of the inspection was the Moscow ceremonial fanfare under the direction of conductor Vasily Agapkin. The parade was opened by the young drummers of the Corps of Drums from the Moscow School of Musicians, wearing uniforms similar to those of the Moscow Suvorov Military School and led by a bandmaster, which after marching past soon took its place behind the massed bands to provide additional support. The parade ended with the Glory to the Motherland march. Additional marches have included Jaeger March, March of the 92nd Pechersk Regiment, March of the Leningrad Guards Divisions, March "Joy of Victory", March "Hero".

Parade participants 

 Marshal of the Soviet Union Georgy Zhukov (parade inspector)
 Marshal of the Soviet Union Konstantin Rokossovsky (parade commander)
 Military bands
 Massed military bands of the Moscow Military District
 Conductor: Major Gen. Semyon Tchernetsky, Senior Director of Music of the Central Military Orchestra of the People's Commissariat of National Defense
 Moscow A. Surovov Military Music School Corps of Drums

Ground column
 Fronts of the Soviet Army, Navy, Army Air Forces and Air Defense Forces composed of:
 Ground Troops and Air Force officers and personnel of the following fronts:
 Karelian - led by Regimental Commanders Maj. Gen. Grigory Kalinovsky and Marshal Kirill Meretskov
 Leningrad - led by Regimental Commanders Maj. Gen. Andrei Stuchenko and Marshal Leonid Govorov
 1st Baltic - led by Regimental Commanders Guards Lt. Gen. Anton Lopatin and General of the Army Ivan Bagramyan
 1st Belorussian - led by Regimental Commanders Maj. Gen. Ivan Rosly and Col. Gen. Vasili Chuikov
 2nd Belorussian - led by Regimental Commanders Lt. Gen. Kosntantin Erastov and General of the Army Vasily Sokolovsky
 3rd Belorussian - led by Regimental Commander Marshal Aleksandr Vasilevsky
 1st Polish Army Color Guard Company led by Chief of the Army General Staff, General Władysław Korczyc (the only foreign army squad invited for the parade)
 1st Ukrainian - led by Regimental Commanders Maj. Gen. Gleb Baklanov and Marshal Ivan Konev
 4th Ukrainian - led by Regimental Commanders Guards Lt. Gen. Andrei Bonddarev and Marshal Fyodor Tolbukhin
 2nd Ukrainian - led by Regimental Commanders Lt. Gen. Ivan Afonin and General of the Army Andrei Yeremenko
 3rd Ukrainian - led by Regimental Commanders Guards Maj. Gen. Nikolai Biryukov and Marshal Rodion Malinovsky, and the Commander of Bulgarian 1 st Army Lt. Gen Vladimir Stoychev 
 Fleet, Land and Air personnel of the Soviet Navy, under Navy Contingent Commander Vice Adm. Vladimir Fadeev
 Northern Fleet
 Baltic Fleet
 Dnieper Flotilla
 Danube Flotilla
 Caspian Flotilla
 Black Sea Fleet
 Naval Infantry
 Coastal Forces (including naval artillery)
 Combined battalion of the Corps of Cadets, M.V. Frunze Naval College and Naval Engineering Academy
 Flag Disposal regiment of the 1st Internal Troops Division of the USSR NKVD "Felix Dzerzhinsky" composed of captured enemy standards and colors carried by the fronts
 Maj. Gen. Mikhail Duka was entrusted with carrying the symbolic key to the defeated city of Berlin
 Moscow Military District, Armed Forces of the Soviet Union contingent under Garrison and District Commander Col. Gen. Pavel Artemyev
 Military Schools and Academies Combined Joint Division
 Officers and other ranks of the People's Commisariat of Defense
 M. V. Frunze Military Academy
 Suvorov Military School
 Military Armored Troops Service School
 Military Engineering Academy
 F. Dzerzhinsky Military Artillery School
 Lenin Military-Political Academy
 Air Force Engineering Academy
 Moscow City Soviet Border Protection Superior College
 Moscow Military Infantry Training School
 Guards Mortars Training School 
 Airborne Troops Officer Candidate School
 Technical Forces Officer School
 Infantry Units
 Kremlin Regiment
 OMSDON 1st NKVD Internal Troops Mechanized Rifle Division (Special Duties) "Felix Dzerzhinsky"
 2nd NKVD Internal Troops Division
 Border Protection and Security Service of the NKVD
 K-9 Units (engineering, medical troops, anti-tank)

Mounted column
 Army Cavalry regiments within the Moscow area
 Army Horse Artillery
 M1927
 M1909
 152 mm howitzer M1909/30
 122 mm howitzer M1910/30 (also used by the regular artillery)
 Tachanka battalion

Mobile column
Soviet Air Defence Forces 
 Anti-aircraft guns (towed and truck-mounted)
 72-K
 61-K
 52-K
 Searchlight trucks
 Acoustic range finders
 Army Rocket Forces and Field Artillery
 Mortars 
 160mm Mortar M1943
 120-PM-43 mortar
 Field guns
 76 mm divisional gun M1942 (ZiS-3)
 100 mm field gun M1944 (BS-3)
 76 mm divisional gun M1936 (F-22)
 76 mm regimental gun M1943
 85 mm divisional gun D-44
 Anti-tank guns
 53-K
 M-42
 ZiS-2
 Mountain guns
 76 mm mountain gun M1938 (also used by the Airborne)
 Katyusha rocket launchers of the Army Rocket Forces and Artillery
 BM-8
 BM-13
 BM-30/BM-31
 Howitzers
 D-1
 M-10
 ML-20
 M-30
 B-4
 A-19
 152 mm gun M1935 (Br-2)
 203 mm howitzer M1931 (B-4)
 122 mm howitzer M1910/30
 Army Infantry - joint regiment of motorized infantry formations
 Dnepr M-72 motorcycles
 BA-64 armored cars
 BA-20
 Army Airborne Forces
 Army Tank Forces contingent
 T-34 (Victory tanks)
 T-34/85
 IS-2
 T-44
 T-70
 Army Artillery self-propelled artillery contingent
 SU-76
 SU-100
 SU-152
 ISU-152
 ISU-122
 SU-85
 SU-122

Legacy 

Outside the 1945 parade, the only parade to be held on 24 June was organized on in 2020 in honor of the 75th anniversary of the victory. Elements of the 1945 parade were included in the 2020 parade, the most notable of which being the bands playing the Jubilee Slow March "25 Years of the Red Army" at the outset of the inspection stage.
A statue of Zhukov on his parade horse is located near the State Historical Museum on Manezhnaya Square. There was an original debate over where to place the statue, with many saying that it should be located at the site of the parade, Red Square.
During the 2010 Moscow Victory Day Parade, the contingent from Turkmenistan, upon request from the government of Turkmenistan, was led by an officer riding on horseback, with the horse being a descendant of the horse used during the 1945 parade.
In 2008, during the celebrations of the Independence Day of South Ossetia, the annual military parade in Tskhinvali saw Georgian flags being thrown to the ground by South Ossetian militiamen, resembling how Soviet soldiers threw German flags on Red Square during the parade of 1945.
In 2020, during a Victory Parade in the South Ossetian capital of Tskhinval, equestrian team from the Russian FSB took part, with the equestrian ranks being led by an officer on a stallion called Brilliant, a direct descendant of Idol.
In the 2017 Moscow Victory Day Parade, officers wore the new standing-collar tunic for the first time, which was supposed to resemble the uniforms officer corps in the 1945 Parade of Victors. At the 2020 parade, the Mongolian contingent wore a modified version of those uniforms and later that year, officers of the Korean People's Army wore uniforms based on those worn at the 1945 parade at a military parade on Kim Il-sung Square.
In June 1994, the Union of Participants of the Parade on Red Square on 24 June was registered, chaired by retired Colonel Valentin Privalov. The same year, a competition was announced to create a badge for the participant of the parade. As attributes of the union, the breastplate and certificate of a participant in the parade were approved.
In the Kazakh city of Almaty, there is a street near Abay Avenue on called 24 June Street, named in honor of the first Victory Parade.
At different times, postage stamps depicting the parade on Red Square were issued.

See also 
List of German standards at the Moscow Victory Parade of 1945
Berlin Victory Parade of 1945
London Victory Celebrations of 1946

References

Works cited

External links

Moscow Victory Parade Video // Net-Film Newsreels and Documentary Films Archive
Official site for the 65th anniversary of the original Victory Parade of June 24, 1945
 German Flags at the 1945 Soviet Victory Parade
 Official site of the 2005 Russian 60th celebration of the 1945 Victory Parade
 Russian site from where the short video of the parade can be downloaded
 Video of the parade

1945 in the Soviet Union
Eastern Front (World War II)
Events in Moscow

Victory parades
Parades in Russia
1945 in military history
Articles containing video clips
June 1945 events in Europe
1945 in Russia
1945 in Moscow